See also Stanisław Albrecht Radziwiłł.

Stanisław "the Pious" Radziwiłł (12 May 1559 – 19 March 1599) was a sixth generation Radziwill family noble (szlachcic) of the Grand Duchy of Lithuania in the Polish–Lithuanian Commonwealth. He was a Elder of Samogitia (1595 until his death in 1599), a first ordynat of Olyka, and the Great Lithuanian Marshal (from 1592 until his death).

He was the son of Mikołaj "the Black" Radziwiłł and Elżbieta Szydłowiecka. Raised as a Calvinist, he converted to Roman Catholicism and was known as a very pious person, which gained him the nickname Pobożny (Pious). He was also known for his scholarly interests - he collected books and could read in many languages. He avoided politics, but fought in the wars with Muscovy under the Polish king Stefan Batory. He built most of the Olyka Castle.

Stanislaw was a thoroughly educated person and knew several foreign languages. He translated from Greek into Polish part of the work of the Patriarch of Constantinople Gennadius Scholarius, containing commentaries on the five articles of the Florentine Union, which was published in 1586. He was the author of a work on the main truths of the faith entitled Oręże duchowne prawowitego rycerza chrześcijańskiego, published in Kraków in 1591. Immediately after becoming the Elder of Samogitia, he wrote to his brother Mikołaj Krzysztof Radzwiłł: "While learning various languages, I forgot Lithuanian, and now I see, I have to go to school again, because that language, as I see, God willing, will be needed." This was because the Lithuanian language remained dominant in Samogitia, unlike in certain other areas of the Grand Duchy of Lithuania.

References

Sources 
 
 
 Margaret Odrowaz-Sypniewska, The Radziwill Dynasty:  From Pagan Times to the 1960s - Part One, http://www.angelfire.com/mi4/polcrt/radziwill.html

Secular senators of the Polish–Lithuanian Commonwealth
Ruthenian nobility of the Polish–Lithuanian Commonwealth
Polish Roman Catholics
Converts to Roman Catholicism from Calvinism
Stanislaw Pious
1559 births
1599 deaths
Military personnel from Vilnius
Grand Marshals of the Grand Duchy of Lithuania